The Arboretum de la Cude (5 hectares) is a private arboretum located about 1 km outside Mailleroncourt-Charette, Haute-Saône, Franche-Comté, France. It is open daily; an admission fee is charged.

The arboretum was established in 1995 on a site under family ownership since 1880, which had been at various times a fruit orchard and a plantation of Pseudotsuga menziesii. Today it contains about 3,000 trees and bushes representing 450 species from all continents, including a good specimen of Chamaecyparis lawsoniana (planted 1900), as well as Araucaria, Ceratostigma willmottianum, × Chitalpa tashkentensis, Choisya ternata, Decaisnea fargesii, Ginkgo biloba, Koelreuteria paniculata, Leycesteria formosa, Ptelea trifoliata, Sequoia, Skimmia japonica, and Zelkova carpinifolia.

See also 
 List of botanical gardens in France

References 
 Arboretum de la Cude
 1001 Fleurs entry (French)
 Parcs et Jardins entry (French)
 Culture.fr entry (French)

Cude, Arboretum de la
Cude, Arboretum de la